Aruppukkottai division is a revenue division in the Virudhunagar district of Tamil Nadu, India.

References 

Virudhunagar district